Saxifraga oppositifolia, the purple saxifrage or purple mountain saxifrage, is a species of plant that is very common in the high Arctic and also some high mountainous areas further south, including northern Britain, the Alps and the Rocky Mountains.

Saxifraga oppositifolia grows at a latitude of 83°40'N on Kaffeklubben Island, making it one of the northernmost plants in the world.

Description
The leaves are small, rounded, scale-like, opposite in four rows with ciliated margins. The flowers are solitary on short stalks, petals purple or lilac, much longer than the calyx lobes. It is one of the first spring flowers, continuing to flower during the whole summer in localities where the snow melts later.

Ecology

Habitat
Its native habitats include tundra, arctic coastal bluffs, alpine scree, and rock crevices. 

Species interactions
The flowers of Saxifraga oppositifolia may be consumed by certain animal species, such as the caterpillars of the cold-adapted Gynaephora groenlandica, the Arctic woolly-bear caterpillar.

Uses
Saxifraga oppositifolia is a popular plant in alpine gardens, though difficult to grow in warm climates.

The edible flower petals are eaten, particularly in parts of Nunavut without abundant berries. They are bitter at first but, after about one second, they become sweet. (They are also slightly sticky.) The leaves and stems are brewed for herbal tea: According to many Nunavummiut, the tea is best later in the season once the flowers have died.

Saxifraga oppositifolia serves as the territorial flower of Nunavut in Canada, a symbolic flower of Nordland county in Norway, and the county flower of County Londonderry in Northern Ireland.

Taxonomy
There are a few subspecies of Saxifraga oppositifolia, including:
Saxifraga oppositifolia ssp. glandulisepala Hultén – native to Alaska
Saxifraga oppositifolia ssp. oppositifolia L. – native to continental US
Saxifraga oppositifolia ssp. smalliana (Engl. & Irmsch.) Hultén – native to Alaska

References

oppositifolia
Alpine flora
Flora of the Alps
Flora of the Arctic
Flora of Europe
Flora of North America
Flora of temperate Asia
Edible plants
Territorial symbols of Nunavut
Plants described in 1753
Taxa named by Carl Linnaeus